The Calf of Flotta is a small island in Scapa Flow, Orkney. The Calf is next to Flotta, with "Calf" deriving from Old Norse/Norn and meaning a smaller island by a larger one.

Geography and geology
The Calf is made of red sandstone.

References

Calves (islands)
Uninhabited islands of Orkney